The 2022–23 season is the 57th season in the existence of Antalyaspor and the club's 27th consecutive season in the top flight of Turkish football. In addition to the domestic league, Antalyaspor are participating in this season's editions of the Turkish Cup.

Kits
Antalyaspor's 2022–23 kits, manufactured by Nike, released on 2 July 2022 and were up for sale on the same day.

Supplier: Nike / Main sponsor: VavaCars / Sleeve sponsor: Corendon Airlines / Back sponsor: Anex Tour / Short sponsor: Kırbıyık Holding, Doruk Yapım / Socks sponsor: Bitexen

Players

First-team squad

Transfers

In

Out

Pre-season and friendlies

Pre-season

Mid-season

Competitions

Overall record

Süper Lig

League table

Results summary

Pld = Matches played; W = Matches won; D = Matches drawn; L = Matches lost; GF = Goals for; GA = Goals against; GD = Goal difference; Pts = Points

Results by round

Matches

Turkish Cup

Statistics

Goalscorers

 Last updated: 11 March 2023.

References

Antalyaspor seasons
Antalyaspor